Asteranthos is a genus of woody plant in the family Lecythidaceae. There is only one known species, Asteranthos brasiliensis, native to Venezuela and Brazil.

Asteranthos brasiliensis is listed as having "near threatened" status.

References

Lecythidaceae
Monotypic Ericales genera
Flora of South America
Taxa named by René Louiche Desfontaines
Taxonomy articles created by Polbot